Arthur Wellesley Foshay Jr. (1918–1998) was a school principal and consultant in California and Ohio, and director of the Bureau of Educational Research at Ohio State University. Born in Oakland, California, he was a graduate of the University of California, Berkeley, and attended the Teachers College at Columbia University, NY, and attained a doctorate in education.

Foshay was president of the Association for Supervision and Curriculum Development, president of the John Dewey Society, and a founder of the International Association for the Evaluation of Educational Attainment.
He wrote several books and numerous articles for educational journals, was a consultant to school systems in this country and abroad, and was listed in "Who's Who in Education," "Who's Who in America," and "Who's Who in the World."

Works
 Children's Social Values (1954) (with Kenneth D. Wann) 
 The Rand McNally Handbook of Education (1963)
 The Professional as Educator (1970) (as editor)
 Transcendence and Mathematics

References

1918 births
1998 deaths
People from Oakland, California
University of California, Berkeley alumni
Teachers College, Columbia University alumni
20th-century American educators
Ohio State University staff